The Lake Cochituate Dam is a historic dam on the southwestern side of Lake Cochituate in Framingham, Massachusetts.  The  dam was built in 1890, replacing two earlier wooden dams, dating back to the 1846 construction of the Cochituate Aqueduct.  The core of the dam is granite rubble laid in concrete.  Lake Cochituate was taken out of service as part of Boston's public water supply in the 1930s, and the lake and dam were eventually turned over to the state, which established Cochituate State Park.

The dam was listed on the National Register of Historic Places in 1990.

See also
National Register of Historic Places listings in Framingham, Massachusetts

References

Dams on the National Register of Historic Places in Massachusetts
Dams completed in 1890
National Register of Historic Places in Middlesex County, Massachusetts
Buildings and structures in Framingham, Massachusetts
Dams in Massachusetts
1890 establishments in Massachusetts